The 2014 Metro Atlantic Athletic Conference women's basketball tournament will be held March 6–10 at the MassMutual Center in Springfield, Massachusetts. The tournament will be held in Springfield through 2014. The winner of the tournament receives the conference's automatic bid into the 2014 NCAA tournament.

Bracket and Results
 

All times listed are Eastern

See also
 Metro Atlantic Athletic Conference
 MAAC women's basketball tournament

External links
 2014 MAAC Women's Basketball Championship

References

MAAC women's basketball tournament
Basketball in Springfield, Massachusetts
College basketball tournaments in Massachusetts
21st century in Springfield, Massachusetts
Women's sports in Massachusetts